Jarrutha is a Basic People's Congress administrative division of Benghazi, Libya.

References

Basic People's Congress divisions of Benghazi